The 1980 Cal Poly Pomona Broncos football team represented California State Polytechnic University, Pomona as a member of the California Collegiate Athletic Association (CCAA) during the 1980 NCAA Division II football season. Led by first-year head coach Roman Gabriel, Cal Poly Pomona compiled an overall record of 3–7 with a mark of 0–2 in conference play, placing last out of three teams in the CCAA. The team was outscored by its opponents 322 to 171 for the season. Those totals included an 86-point defeat by a score of 93–7 at the hands of Portland State on October 25. The Broncos played home games at Kellogg Field in Pomona, California.

Schedule

References

Cal Poly Pomona
Cal Poly Pomona Broncos football seasons
Cal Poly Pomona Broncos football